is a type of poetry in classical Japanese literature.

Etymology
The word waka has two different but related meanings: the original meaning was "poetry in Japanese" and encompassed several genres such as chōka and sedōka (discussed below); the later, more common definition refers to poetry in a 5-7-5-7-7 metre. However, by the time of the Kokinshūs compilation at the beginning of the tenth century, all of these forms except for the tanka and chōka had effectively gone extinct, and chōka had significantly diminished in prominence. As a result, the word waka became effectively synonymous with tanka, and the word tanka fell out of use until it was revived at the end of the nineteenth century (see Tanka).

Tanka (hereafter referred to as waka) consist of five  of 5-7-5-7-7 on or syllabic units. Therefore, tanka is sometimes called , meaning it contains 31 syllables in total.

Forms of waka
These last three forms, however, fell into disuse at the beginning of the Heian period, and chōka vanished soon afterwards. Thus, the term waka came in time to refer only to tanka.Digital Daijisen dictionary entry for "waka": "Poetry unique to Japan, written since ancient times, and used in contrast with kanshi. A general name for various types of poetry including chōka, tanka, sedōka and kata-uta, which are composed in lines of 5 and 7 on. From the Heian period on the word came to refer primarily to tanka. Also called yamato-uta."

ChōkaChōka''' consist of 5-7 on phrases repeated at least twice, and conclude with a 5-7-7 ending

The briefest chōka documented is Man'yōshū no. 802, which is of a pattern 5-7 5-7 5-7 5-7-7. It was composed by Yamanoue no Okura in the Nara period and runs:

[English translation by Edwin Cranston]

In the early Heian period (at the beginning of the 10th century), chōka was seldom written and tanka became the main form of waka. Since then, the generic term waka came to be almost synonymous with tanka. Famous examples of such works are the diaries of Ki no Tsurayuki and Izumi Shikibu, as well as such collections of poem tales as The Tales of Ise and The Tales of Yamato.

Minor forms of waka
Lesser forms of waka featured in the Man'yōshū and other ancient sources exist. Besides that, there were many other forms like:Bussokusekika: This form carved on a slab of slate – the "Buddha footprint" or bussokuseki – at the Yakushi-ji temple in Nara. Also recorded in the Man'yōshū. The pattern is 5-7-5-7-7-7.Sedōka: The Man'yōshū and Kokinshū recorded this form. The pattern is 5-7-7-5-7-7.Katauta: The Man'yōshū recorded this form. Katauta means "half-poem". The pattern is 5-7-7.

History
Waka has a long history, first recorded in the early 8th century in the Kojiki and Man'yōshū. Under influence from other genres such as kanshi, novels and stories such as Tale of Genji and even Western poetry, it developed gradually, broadening its repertoire of expression and topics.

In literary historian Donald Keene's books, he uses four large categories
Early and Heian Literature (Kojiki to past The Tale of Genji to 1185)
The Middle Ages ('chūsei' from 1185, including the Kamakura and Muromachi periods)
Pre-Modern Era (1600–1867, then subdivided into 1600–1770 and 1770–1867)
Modern Era (post 1867, divided into Meiji (1868–1912), Taishō (1912–1926) and Shōwa (from 1927)).

Ancient
The most ancient waka were recorded in the historical record the Kojiki and the 20 volumes of the Man'yōshū, the oldest surviving waka anthology. The editor of the Man'yōshū is anonymous, but it is believed that the final editor was Ōtomo no Yakamochi. He was a waka poet who belonged to the youngest generation represented in the anthology; indeed, the last volume is dominated by his poems. The first waka of volume 1 was by Emperor Ōjin. Nukata no Ōkimi, Kakinomoto no Hitomaro, Yamabe no Akahito, Yamanoue no Okura, Ōtomo no Tabito and his son Yakamochi were the greatest poets in this anthology. The Man'yōshū recorded not only the works of the royalty and nobility, but also works of soldiers and farmers whose names were not recorded. The main topics of the Man'yōshū were love, sadness (especially on the occasion of someone's death), and other miscellaneous topics.
Early songs

Songs and poetry in the Kojiki and the Nihon ShokiThe Man'yōshūClassical

Heian revival
During the Nara period and the early Heian period, the court favored Chinese-style poetry (kanshi) and the waka art form largely fell out of official favor. But in the 9th century, Japan stopped sending official envoys to Tang dynasty China. This severing of ties, combined with Japan's geographic isolation, essentially forced the court to cultivate native talent and look inward, synthesizing Chinese poetic styles and techniques with local traditions. The waka form again began flourishing, and Emperor Daigo ordered the creation of an anthology of waka, where the waka of ancient poets and their contemporaries were collected; the anthology was named "Kokin Wakashū", meaning Collection of Ancient and Modern Japanese Poems. It was presented to the emperor in 905. This was the first waka anthology edited and issued under imperial auspices, and it commenced a long and distinguished tradition of imperial anthologies of waka that continued up to the Muromachi period.
Rise of Japanese national culture

The first three chokusenshūThe  were the Kokin Wakashū, the Gosen Wakashū and the Shūi Wakashū. The Kokinshū was compiled by Ki no Tsurayuki, Ki no Tomonori, Ōshikōchi no Mitsune and Mibu no Tadamine on the orders of Emperor Daigo in 905. It collected roughly 1,100 waka that had not appeared in the Man'yōshū into 20 volumes, arranged by theme. The Kokinshū poems are generally considered to be reflective and idealistic.

Roughly half a century after the compilation of the Kokinshū, in 951, Emperor Murakami commanded the Five Men of the Pear Chamber to compile the Gosen Wakashū, in addition to preparing kundoku readings for the Man'yōshū, which by that time was already difficult for even educated Japanese to read.

In 1005 Emperor Ichijō commanded the compilation of the Shūishū.

The five later-Heian anthologies

Medieval

Kamakura and Muromachi periods
After the Heian period, during the Kamakura period and later, renga, a form of collaborative linked poetry, began to develop. In the late Heian period, three of the last great waka poets appeared: Fujiwara no Shunzei, his son Fujiwara no Teika, and Emperor Go-Toba. Emperor Go-Toba ordered the creation of a new anthology and joined in editing it. The anthology was named Shin Kokin Wakashū. He edited it again and again until he died in 1239. Teika made copies of ancient books and wrote on the theory of waka. His descendants, and indeed almost all subsequent poets, such as Shōtetsu, taught his methods and studied his poems. The courtly poetry scenes were historically dominated by a few noble clans and allies, each of which staked out a position.

By this period, a number of clans had fallen by the wayside, leaving the Reizei and the Nijō families; the former stood for "progressive" approaches, the varied use of the "ten styles" and novelty, while the latter conservatively hewed to already established norms and the "ushin" (deep feelings) style that dominated courtly poetry. Eventually, the Nijo family became defunct, leading to the ascendancy of the "liberal" Reizei family.  Their innovative reign was soon deposed by the Asukai family, aided by the Ashikaga shōgun, Ashikaga Yoshinori.

In the Muromachi period, renga became popular in the court and people around it. It spread to the priestly classes and thence to wealthy commoners. In much the same way as waka, renga anthologies were produced under the imperial aegis.  As momentum and popular interest shifted to the renga form, the tanka style was left to the Imperial court. Conservative tendencies exacerbated the loss of life and flexibility. A tradition named Kokin-denju, the heritage of Kokin Wakashū, was developed. It was a system on how to analyze the Kokin Wakashū and included the secret (or precisely lost) meaning of words. Studying waka degenerated into learning the many intricate rules, allusions,  theories, and secrets, so as to produce tanka that would be accepted by the court.

There were comical waka already in the Kojiki and the Man'yōshū, but the noble style of waka in the court inhibited and scorned such aspects of waka. Renga was soon in the same position with many codes and strictures reflecting literary tradition. Haikai no renga (also called just haikai (playful renga)) and kyōka, comical waka, were a reaction to this seriousness. But in the Edo-period waka itself lost almost all of its flexibility and began to echo and repeat old poems and themes.

Early modern

Edo period (1603–1867)
In the early Edo period, waka was not a fashionable genre. Newly created haikai no renga (of whose hokku, or opening verse, haiku was a late 19th-century revision) was the favored genre. This tendency was kept during this period, but in the late Edo period waka faced new trends from beyond the court. Motoori Norinaga, the great reviver of the traditional Japanese literature, attempted to revive waka as a way of providing "traditional feeling expressed in genuine Japanese way". He wrote waka, and waka became an important form to his followers, the Kokugaku scholars.

In Echigo Province a Buddhist priest, Ryōkan, composed many waka in a naïve style intentionally avoiding complex rules and the traditional way of waka. He belonged to another great tradition of waka: waka for expressing religious feeling. His frank expression of his feeling found many admirers, then and now. In the cities, a comical, ironic and satiric form of waka emerged. It was called kyōka (狂歌), mad poem, and was loved by intellectual people in big cities like Edo and Osaka. It was not precisely a new form; satirical waka was a style known since ancient times. But it was in the Edo period that this aspect of waka developed and reached an artistic peak. Still, most waka poets kept to ancient tradition or made those reformation another stereotype, and waka was not a vibrant genre in general at the end of this period.

Modern

Notable waka poets

Famous waka collections
 Nijūichidaishū – The collective name for all 21 Imperially-commissioned waka anthologies
 Hyakunin Isshu – Fujiwara no Teika's collection of 100 poems by 100 poets
 Kokka Taikan – An encyclopaedic collection with index, first published in 1901
 SankashūGlossary of terms related to waka composition

See also
 Death poem – Japanese death poem (jisei) is mostly made in waka form
 Utakai Hajime – Emperor's waka meeting at the start of the year
 Iroha – Old Japanese syllabary in 7-5 metre poem form
 Kimigayo - Japanese national anthem based on a waka of early 10th century

Bibliography of waka anthologies in English translation and relevant scholarly works
Brower, Robert H., and Earl Miner, Japanese Court Poetry, Stanford University Press, 1961.  pbk
527 pp., a standard academic study.
Carter, Steven D., editor and translator, Traditional Japanese Poetry: An Anthology. Stanford University Press, 1991
Waka, tanka, renga, haiku and senryū with translations and annotations
Carter, Steven D., editor and translator, Waiting for the Wind: Thirty-Six Poets of Japan's Late Medieval Age, Columbia University Press, 1989
Cranston, Edwin, editor and translator, A Waka Anthology, Volume One: The Gem-Glistening Cup, Stanford University Press, 1993.  cloth  pbk
988 pp. includes almost all waka from the Kojiki (Record of Ancient Matters completed 712) through the Man'yōshū (Collection for Ten Thousand Generations c.759) and also includes the Buddha's Footstone Poems (21 Bussokuseki poems carved in stone at the Yakushi-ji temple in Nara, c. 753)
Cranston, Edwin, editor and translator, A Waka Anthology, Volume Two: Grasses of Remembrance, Stanford University Press, 2006.  cloth
McCullough, Helen Craig, Brocade by Night: 'Kokin Wakashū' and the Court Style in Japanese Classical Poetry, Stanford University Press, 1985
McCullough, Helen Craig, Kokin Wakashū: The First Imperial Anthology of Japanese Poetry, with 'Tosa Nikki' and 'Shinsen Waka', Stanford University Press 1985
Miner, Earl, An Introduction to Japanese Court Poetry, Stanford University Press, 1968.
Based on Brower and Miner
Philippi, Donald, translator, This Wine of Peace, the Wine of Laughter: A Complete Anthology of Japan's Earliest Songs, New York, Grossman, 1968
Sato, Hiroaki, and Watson, Burton, editors and translators, From the Country of Eight Islands: An Anthology of Japanese Poetry'', multiple editions available
Shirane Haruo, Nobuyuki Kanechiku, Kumiko Tabuchi, Hidenori Jinno, editors, "世界へひらく和歌　Waka Opening Up to the World", Benseisyuppan, 2012

References

External links 
 WakaPoetry.net

Poetic forms
 
Japanese literary terminology
Japanese literature
Japanese poetry
Articles containing Japanese poems
Stanzaic form